Boseong O clan was one of the Korean clans. Their Bon-gwan was in Boseong County, South Jeolla Province. According to the research in 2015, the number of Boseong O clan was 71162. Their founder was O Hyeon-pil. He was appointed as the governor of Boseong county for protecting Goryeo from the Kitan in 1216.

References